Kim Jin-tae (born 15 June 1964) is a South Korean hurdler. He competed in the men's 110 metres hurdles at the 1988 Summer Olympics.

References

1964 births
Living people
Athletes (track and field) at the 1988 Summer Olympics
South Korean male hurdlers
Olympic athletes of South Korea
Place of birth missing (living people)
Asian Games medalists in athletics (track and field)
Asian Games bronze medalists for South Korea
Athletes (track and field) at the 1986 Asian Games
Medalists at the 1986 Asian Games
20th-century South Korean people